Affane is a small village in west County Waterford, Ireland, situated near  Cappoquin and the River Blackwater.

History
References to the town of Affane are limited to its inclusion on a list dated 1300 and an incident in 1312, but the presence of a church and castle 300m apart suggests the presence of a medieval settlement.  The Battle of Affane between the Desmond and Ormonde clans was fought in the area in 1565.

The ruins of a Church of Ireland church are located within a graveyard.  The parish church of Affane, listed as Athmethan and valued at over £6 in the ecclesiastical taxation (1302-1306) was located south of the ruins.  By the mid 16th century it had been united with the church of Dungarvan, but in a visitation of 1588 it was in the Deanery of Ardmore.

Sport
The local Gaelic Athletic Association club is Affane Cappoquin GAA. In 1974, Affane won its only Waterford Senior Football Championship, defeating Dunhill by 1-8 to 0-6, before losing to Austin Stacks in the Munster Senior Club Football Championship.

See also
 Battle of Affane
 Gerald Fitzgerald, 14th Earl of Desmond
 Thomas Butler, 10th Earl of Ormonde
 List of towns and villages in Ireland

References

External links
 Abandoned Ireland - Affane Church
 Abandoned Ireland - Affane House

Towns and villages in County Waterford
Townlands of County Waterford